Canoeing and Kayaking were held at the 1998 Asian Games in Bangkok, Thailand from 8 to 11 December. Men's and women's competition were held in Kayak and men's competition in Canoe with all events having taken place at the Map Prachan Reservoir in Chonburi. The competition included only sprint events.

Medalists

Men

Women

Medal table

References

 
1998 Asian Games events
1998
Asian Games
1998 Asian Games